Dolly Montoya Castaño (Pereira, May 26, 1948), also known as Dolly Montoya, is a university professor and Colombian scientist.

She served as the rector of the National University of Colombia for the period of 2018–2021 and was re-elected for the period of 2021–2024. She is the first woman to hold the position of rector at this institution.

In addition to promoting academic research for some of the most vulnerable communities in the country, she directed the Institute of Biotechnology (Instituto de Biotecnología, IBUN) between 1987 and 1995.

Academic education 
Dolly Montoya Castaño is a pharmaceutical chemist from the National University of Colombia (1977), with a master's degree in basic biomedical sciences from the National Autonomous University of Mexico and a Ph.D. in natural sciences from the Technical University of Munich. Her thesis  «Anaerobic, Solvent-Producing Bacteria: Molecular Characterisation, Polysaccharolytic Activity and Agro-Industrial Waste Degradation» was recognized with magna cum laude. Several of her publications affiliated with the National University of Colombia can be found on ResearchGate and other research portals.

For her academic and scientific career, Montoya has received several awards, including the "Medalla al Mejor Desempeño Académico Gabino Barreda" of the Autonomous University of Mexico (1983), Woman of Success in Colombia (2010),  Prize for Scientific Merit (award "Samper Martinez") of the National Institute of Health (2017) and the decoration Order Cross of the Founders, granted by the Mayor of Pereira (2018).

References

External links 
 

1948 births
Living people